The Croix de Guerre 1939–1945 (English: War Cross 1939–1945) is a French military decoration, a version of the Croix de Guerre created on 26 September 1939 to honour people who fought with the Allies against the Axis forces at any time during World War II. After Germany invaded and overran mainland France in the Battle of France in May and June 1940, this Croix de Guerre was replaced by the pro-Axis Vichy French government with another Croix with a black-and-green ribbon, while the original was upheld by Free France. Since the triumph of the Free French side in World War II, this version is the only one officially recognized by the French government.

Award statute
Due to the large extent of the war zone, recipients included those who fought during, with, at, or in the following:
 Battle of France
 French Forces of the Interior
 Free French Forces
 Western Front
 Middle East Theater
 Mediterranean Theater
 African campaigns

Award description

Medal 
The Croix de Guerre was designed by the sculptor Paul-Albert Bartholomé. In the center of the front is the profile of the French Republic crested by a Phrygian cap. Around this portrait, are the words République française ("French Republic"). On the reverse of the medal are the dates of the conflict : 1939–1940, 1939–1945, or simply 1940.

Ribbon 
 The suspension and service ribbon of the medal has a red background crossed with four green lines in its center.

Devices
On every medal and ribbon, there is at least one ribbon device, either in the shape of a palm or of a star, and fashioned from either bronze, silver, or silver-gilt (vermeil).  The relative importance of the six possible combinations is detailed below. The total number of devices on a "Croix de Guerre" is not limited.

Award grades

Mentioned in Despatches 
The lowest degree is represented by a bronze star while the highest degree is represented by a bronze palm:
  Bronze star (étoile en bronze) for those who had been mentioned at the regiment or brigade level.
  Silver star (étoile en argent), for those who had been mentioned at the division level.
 Silver-gilt star (étoile en vermeil), for those who had been mentioned at the corps level.
  Bronze palm (palme en bronze), for those who had been mentioned at the army level.
 Silver palm (palme en argent), represents five bronze ones.
 Silver-gilt palm (palme en vermeil), for those who had been mentioned at the Free French Forces level (World War II only).

The clasps are awarded for gallantry to any member of the French military or its allies and are, depending on the degree, roughly the equivalent to the U.S. Bronze Star  and Silver Star or UK Military Cross and Military Medal.

Vichy France version 

Following the German invasion and occupation of France in May 1940, the French collaborationist government (Vichy France; officially called État français, the "French State") created two croix during World War II, both utilizing a black-and-green ribbon pattern instead of the original red-and-green. These croix were both disavowed by the Free French government and the postwar French government, and wearing them is illegal in France. The Vichy Croix de Guerre employed the same tiered citations for the award as the officially-recognised version, excluding the added gilt palm.

Notable non-French recipients
 Omar Bradley
 Joseph Collins
 Douglas Fairbanks, Jr.
 Frantz Fanon
 Virginia Hall
 Courtney Hodges
 Lyman Lemnitzer
 Audie Murphy
 George S. Patton, Jr.
 Prince Philip, Duke of Edinburgh
 Rainier III, Prince of Monaco
 Douglas MacArthur
 Matthew Ridgway
 James Stewart
 Maxwell Taylor
 Paul F. Warburg
 William Westmoreland
 Earle Wheeler
 Tommy Yeo-Thomas
 Draža Mihajlović

See also
Ribbons of the French military and civil awards
Croix de guerre 1914–1918
Croix de Guerre (Belgium)

References

Military awards and decorations of France
Awards established in 1939
1939 establishments in France
Courage awards